The 2023 World Athletics Road Running Championships are scheduled to take place in Riga, Latvia, from  to . As the inaugural World Athletics Road Running Championships, they will include the World Athletics Half Marathon Championships, which were last held in 2020. A flat, single-lap marathon course in the Baltics' largest city. All courses are traffic-free.

The championships are scheduled to hold races for the half marathon, 5K, and mile distances, and also include mass-participation events for the same.

This will be the first time when any recreational runner who is ready for a challenge can register for any of the official mass races of the World Championships in Riga and earn a unique medal from the World Athletics Road Running Championships.

Preliminary race timetable

Notes

References

External links 
 Official website

World Athletics Half Marathon Championships
World Athletics Road Running Championships
World Athletics Road Running Championships
World Athletics Road Running Championships, 2023
World Athletics Road Running Championships
World Athletics Road Running Championships, 2023
World Athletics Road Running Championships
Athletics World Road Running Championships